The London Philatelic Exhibition 1897 was held from 22 July to 5 August 1897 at the Royal Institute of Painters in Water Colours, London. It was opened by the Duke & Duchess of York. John Tilleard and Gordon Smith were the principal organisers of the exhibition.

See also
List of philatelic exhibitions (by country)

References

External links
The London Philatelic Exhibition in the Otago Witness.

1897 in London
1897
July 1897 events
August 1897 events